= Hickory Run, Virginia =

Unincorporated community in Virginia, United States

Coordinates: 36°57′55″N 77°50′56″W

Hickory Run is an unincorporated community located in Brunswick County, in the U.S. state of Virginia.
